George Beck (February 21, 1890 – October 29, 1973) played professional baseball in 1914 for the Cleveland Naps. Beck pitched one inning in his only game in the majors, allowing one hit and hitting a batter.

References

1890 births
1973 deaths
Cleveland Naps players
Major League Baseball pitchers
Baseball players from South Bend, Indiana
McLeansboro Billikens players
Nashville Vols players
Cleveland Bearcats players
New Orleans Pelicans (baseball) players
Henderson Hens players